The Pentax smc DA* 200mm F2.8 ED (IF) SDM is an interchangeable tele lens for Pentax K-mount, announced by Ricoh on January 23, 2008.

References
http://www.dpreview.com/products/pentax/lenses/pentax_smc_da_200_2p8_if/specifications

Camera lenses introduced in 2008
200